The Stinking River is a short tributary of the Banister River in southern Virginia in the United States.  Via the Banister and Dan Rivers, it is part of the watershed of the Roanoke River, which flows to the Atlantic Ocean.  The Stinking River flows for its entire length in Pittsylvania County.

Course 
Stinking River rises about 3 miles southeast of Sycamore, Virginia and then flows southeast to join the Banister River about 2.5 miles south of Mt. Airy.

Watershed 
Stinking River drains  of area, receives about 45.4 in/year of precipitation, has a wetness index of 422.79, and is about 53% forested.

See also
List of Virginia rivers
Stinking Creek (disambiguation)

References

DeLorme (2005).  Virginia Atlas & Gazetteer.  Yarmouth, Maine: DeLorme.  .

Rivers of Virginia
Rivers of Pittsylvania County, Virginia
Tributaries of the Roanoke River